The 2017–18 Northern Illinois Huskies women's basketball team represents Northern Illinois University during the 2017–18 NCAA Division I women's basketball season. The Huskies, led by third-year head coach Lisa Carlsen, play their home games at the Convocation Center in DeKalb, Illinois as members of the West Division of the Mid-American Conference. They finished the season 15–15, 7–11 in MAC play to finish in fifth place in the West division. They lost in the first round of the MAC women's tournament to Eastern Michigan.

Previous season 
They finished the season 21–12, 12–6 in MAC play to finish in a tie for third place in the West division. They defeated Ohio and Western Michigan in the MAC tournament before losing to Toledo in the championship. They received an at-large bid to the WNIT where they lost in the first round to South Dakota State.

Roster

Schedule and results

|-
!colspan=9 style=| Exhibition

|-
!colspan=9 style=| Non-conference regular season

|-
!colspan=9 style=| MAC regular season

|-
!colspan=9 style=| MAC Women's Tournament

See also
 2017–18 Northern Illinois Huskies men's basketball team

References

Northern Illinois
Northern Illinois Huskies women's basketball seasons